The Sibiu Literary Circle was a literary group created during World War II in Sibiu to promote the modernist liberal ideas of Eugen Lovinescu.

The group was formed around Lucian Blaga and other intellectuals from Cluj, who had settled in Sibiu after the Rumanian University of Cluj had moved there in 1940, in the wake of the Hungarian occupation of Northern Transylvania. The most active members of the group were Ion Negoițescu, Radu Stanca, Ion Desideriu Sârbu, Cornel Regman, Ștefan Augustin Doinaș, Nicolae Balotă, Eugen Todoran, Eta Boeriu, Radu Enescu, and Ovidiu Cotruş. The group disbanded in 1945.

References
 Ovidiu S. Crohmălniceanu, Cercul literar de la Sibiu şi influenţa catalitică a culturii germane, Bucharest: Editura Universalia, 2000.  
 Petru Poantă, Cercul literar de la Sibiu. Introducere în fenomenul originar, Cluj-Napoca: Clusium, 1997.  

Romanian writers' organizations
Literary circles
Romania in World War II
Literary Circle
1940 establishments in Romania
1945 disestablishments in Romania
Arts organizations established in 1940
Organizations disestablished in 1945
Arts organizations disestablished in the 20th century